Charles Vincent MacKay FRACP (3 May 1880 – 26 April 1953) was a noted Australian medical specialist and an Australian rules footballer who played with Melbourne in the Victorian Football League (VFL).

Family
The son of Donald MacKay (1849–1934), and Eleanor (a.k.a. "Helen") MacKay (1855–1930), née Vincent, Charles Vincent MacKay was born at Woods Point, Victoria on 3 May 1880.

He married Rose Nita née Collins, née Mackay (1890–1973) in Marylebone, London, England in 1927.

Football
Charles MacKay played VFL football while studying Medicine at Trinity College.

Medicine
He graduated in medicine from the University of Melbourne at the end of 1905.

Following his graduation, MacKay worked in several Melbourne hospitals, completing a Doctorate of Medicine by Thesis in 1910, and taking the role of medical superintendent of the Melbourne Hospital in 1911.

Military service
At the outbreak of World War I, MacKay joined the Royal Army Medical Corps in England, where he was twice Mentioned in Despatches. Promoted to lieutenant-colonel, he took command of the No 80 General Hospital in Salonika during the latter stages of the war.

Post-war Medicine
MacKay remained in England for several years following the war; and, after returning to Australia, he served as medical assistant to the director of the Australian Institute of Anatomy, Canberra, in 1936, and as Acting Director in 1937.

MacKay was appointed as director of the Anti-Cancer Council of Victoria in 1939.

During World War II he was wartime executive medical officer of the Medical Equipment Control Committee, and after the war he joined the Cancer Institute as a secretary and later served as its executive medical officer.

Death
He died at his residence on 26 April 1953.

Notes

External links 
		

Charlie MacKay on Demonwiki

1880 births
1953 deaths
Australian rules footballers from Victoria (Australia)
Melbourne Football Club players